Expedition of Abu Qatadah ibn Rab'i al-Ansari, to Batn Edam (also spelt Idam) took place in November 629 AD, 8AH, 8th month, of the Islamic Calendar

Expedition
Muhammad was planning on attacking Mecca, with the view of securing a complete news black-out concerning his military intentions, then Muhammad despatched an 8 man platoon under the leadership of Abu Qatadah bin Rab‘i in the direction of Edam, a short distance from Madinah, in Ramadan 8 A.H, in order to divert the attention of people from his main target of attacking Mecca, with which he was pre-occupied.

According to Ibn Sa'd, Ibn Hisham, and many Sunni hadith collections, a Bedouin caravan passed by and they greeted the Muslims with “Assalamu Alaikum.” But Muhallam bin Juthamah (who was with Abu Qatadah) attacked the caravan anyway and killed the leader. They returned to Muhammad with the flock they captured and told him the story.

Muhammad then revealed the verse 4:94.Ibn Kathir interprets this as, God asking Muslims to be more careful when fighting "in the way of Allah", as to reduce the chance of killing Muslims accidentally, as happened in this incident.

Islamic primary sources

The event is mentioned in the Quran verse 4:94:

The famous Muslim scholar Ibn Kathir's commentary of the verse in his Tafsir is as follows:

The event is also referenced in the Sunni Hadith collection, Sahih Muslim as follows:

See also
Military career of Muhammad
List of expeditions of Muhammad

Notes

629
Campaigns ordered by Muhammad